Thomas Leak (born 31 October 2000) is an English professional footballer who plays as a defender for Kidderminster Harriers. He has previously played for Walsall and had loan spells at Salisbury and Bath City.

Career

Walsall
Born in Burton upon Trent, Leak joined Walsall's youth set-up in April 2015. After signing his first professional contract with the club in summer 2019, he joined Salisbury on a one-month loan on 10 October 2019. He scored once in six appearances on loan at the club. He returned to Salisbury in late November 2019 on a loan until 11 January 2020. In January 2020, his loan was extended until March. He returned to Walsall in March 2020, having scored once in 15 appearances in his second loan spell at the club.

In July 2020, Leak signed a new contract with Walsall. On 6 October 2020, he joined Bath City on a one-month youth loan. He made 5 league appearances on loan at the club. On 23 March 2020, Leak made his Walsall debut, starting in a 0–0 League Two draw away to Southend United, with Walsall manager Brian Dutton describing Leak's performance as "outstanding". He made 6 appearances during the 2020–21 season. 

Leak was released by the club at the end of the 2021–22 season.

Kidderminster Harriers
On 10 June 2022, Leak agreed to join National League North club Kiddermindter Harriers upon the expiration of his Walsall contract.

Personal life
Leak is the brother of fellow footballer Ryan who currently plays for Salford City.

Career statistics

References

External links

2000 births
Living people
English footballers
Sportspeople from Burton upon Trent
Association football defenders
Walsall F.C. players
Salisbury F.C. players
Bath City F.C. players
Kidderminster Harriers F.C. players
English Football League players
National League (English football) players
Southern Football League players